Richard B. Lowry (born October 16, 1935) is a former American football coach.  He served as the head coach at Wayne State University in Detroit, Michigan from 1974 to 1979 and at Hillsdale College from 1980 to 1996, compiling a career college football record of 172–75–3.

Coaching career
Lowry was the head football coach at Berea-Midpark High School from 1963 to 1970.  He was the offensive backfield coach for the Akron Zips football team from 1971 to 1973.  Lowry served as the head football coach at Wayne State University for six years from 1974 to 1979, compiling a 38–21–1 record.

Lowry was the head football coach at Hillsdale College in Hillsdale, Michigan.  He held that position for 17 seasons, from 1980 until 1996.  His coaching record at Hillsdale was 134–52–2.

Education
Lowry attended Baldwin Wallace University and received a bachelor's degree in 1957. He also received a master's degree from Kent State University.

Head coaching record

College

References

1935 births
Living people
Akron Zips football coaches
Hillsdale Chargers football coaches
Wayne State Warriors football coaches
High school football coaches in Michigan
Baldwin Wallace University alumni
Kent State University alumni